The AFF Futsal Cup (Formerly the AFF Futsal Club Championship) is the annual Southeast Asian futsal club competition hosted by the ASEAN Football Federation (AFF).

In May 2019, the AFF decided to change the name of the competition from AFF Futsal Club Championship into the AFF Futsal Cup. AFF Futsal Club Championship is the second-biggest futsal club competition in Asia behind AFC Futsal Club Championship.

Summaries

Men's

Medals by nations

Women's

Medals by nations

All medals by nations

References

External links
 Official website

 
International club futsal competitions
Futsal
Futsal competitions in Asia
Recurring sporting events established in 2015
2015 establishments in Southeast Asia
Annual sporting events